The Smolna is an Empire style building in the Kaartinkaupunki district of Helsinki, Finland. It is used as a banquet hall of the Cabinet of Finland and state visit meeting  premises of the President and the Prime Minister.

History 
The Smolna was completed in 1822 as the house of the inspector general of the Military of the Grand Duchy of Finland. In 1835 it was turned into the residence of the Governor-General of Finland. During the 1918 Finnish Civil War, the house served as the Red Guard headquarters and was nicknamed ″Smolna″, after the Bolshevik headquarters in the Smolny Institute of Saint Petersburg. 

After the Civil War, the nickname remained. The building was first the residence of the German general Rüdiger von der Goltz and the regent of Finland C. G. E. Mannerheim until 1919. It was then used by the government and in 1964 became a banqueting hall of the Cabinet of Finland.

References 

Buildings and structures in Helsinki
Carl Ludvig Engel buildings
Government buildings in Finland
Kaartinkaupunki